Veravalli is a village in the Indian state of Andhra Pradesh. It is located in Krishna district.

Villages in Krishna district